Józef Wandzik (born 13 August 1963) is a Polish former professional footballer who played as a goalkeeper.

Club career
Born in Tarnowskie Góry, Wandzik began his career at Rodlo Gorniki, before moving to Ruch Chorzów. After a couple of years playing there, he was transferred to rival club Górnik Zabrze. With Górnik Zabrze, he went on to win the Polish League in 1985-1988 and came third in 1989. His reliability earned him a transfer to Greek club Panathinaikos in the summer of 1990. With Panathinaikos, he achieved much success, reaching the semi-final of the UEFA Champions League in 1995, losing only to Ajax in the second game. He also went ahead and won the Greek League in 1991, 1995 and 1996, the Greek Cup in 1991, 1993, 1994 and 1995, the Greek League and the Greek Supercup in 1993 and 1995. At the same time, Wandzik was unbeaten for 906 and 988 minutes, setting the third and fourth records in Greece. His performances have been memorable to the fans and he has earned the nickname of "Vouno" (translation "mountain"), a nickname he has earned throughout the years for his tremendous presence in the goal.

After almost a decade at Panathinaikos, he had season-long stints at Apollon Smyrnis and Athinaikos, before ending his career in 2001. He was awarded by the Greek Football Federation a Lifetime Achievement Award for his dedication and service to Greek Football. He has been considered by many as the greatest foreign goalkeeper of all times in Greece.

International career
Wandzik started his international career in the Poland national under-18 team with which he reached the finals of the 1981 World Cup. He then went to achieve third place at the Under-20 World Cup with Poland. He moved to the first national team in December 1985 and was the number one pick for the next decade. He won 52 caps for the Poland national team, the first coming on 9 December 1985 against Tunisia, and the last on 25 April 1995 against Israel. He has set the record for the Poland national team for no lost goals in 25 games, beating the record set by the legendary Jan Tomaszewski. Despite his prowess, he only represented Poland at one major tournament, the 1986 FIFA World Cup where he was third-choice behind Józef Młynarczyk and Jacek Kazimierski, and was unable to lead Poland to another tournament since.

International

Managerial career
After his retirement in 2001, Wandzik worked as a goalkeeping coach for Kallithea F.C. but has moved to being a coach for younger talents in different academies.

Honours
Panathinaikos
Greek Championship: 1990–91, 1994–95, 1995–96
Greek Cup: 1990–91, 1992–93, 1993–94, 1994–95,
Greek Super Cup: 1988, 1993

References

1963 births
Living people
People from Tarnowskie Góry
Sportspeople from Silesian Voivodeship
Polish footballers
Association football goalkeepers
Poland international footballers
Poland youth international footballers
1986 FIFA World Cup players
Panathinaikos F.C. players
Naturalized citizens of Greece
Ruch Chorzów players
Apollon Smyrnis F.C. players
Kallithea F.C. players
Athinaikos F.C. players
Górnik Zabrze players
Ekstraklasa players
Super League Greece players
Polish expatriate footballers
Polish expatriate sportspeople in Greece
Expatriate footballers in Greece